In United Kingdom company law, reflective loss is the loss of individual shareholders that is inseparable from general loss of the company. The rule against recovery of reflective loss states that there should be no double recovery, so a shareholder can only bring a derivative action for losses of the company, and may not allege suffering a loss in a personal capacity for a personal right.

Reflective loss extends beyond the diminution of the value of the shares; it extends to the loss of dividends (specifically mentioned in Prudential Assurance v Newman Industries Ltd) and all other payments which the shareholder might have obtained from the company if it had not been deprived of its funds.  All transactions or putative transactions between the company and its shareholders must be disregarded.

In  the Supreme Court of the United Kingdom restricted (but declined to abolish) the doctrine, but disapproved many of the statements made previously in Johnson v Gore Wood & Co, describing Lord Millet's speech in particular as a "wrong turn".  Commentators have indicated of the decision is Sevilleja: "The importance of the decision cannot be overstated."

Legal development

Prudential Assurance v Newman Industries Ltd [1982] Ch 204
Johnson v Gore Wood & Co [2002] 2 AC 1
Giles v Rhind [2002] EWCA Civ 1428
Gardner v Parker [2004] 2 BCLC 554
Sevilleja v Marex Financial Ltd [2020] UKSC 31

See also
United Kingdom company law
Derivative action

Notes

United Kingdom company law